The Municipality of Balmain was a local government area of Sydney, New South Wales, Australia. The municipality was proclaimed in February 1860 and, with an area of 3.8 square kilometres, covered the entire peninsula of Balmain north of Callan Park and Foucart Street, including the present suburbs of Balmain, Balmain East, Birchgrove and Rozelle. The council was amalgamated with the municipalities of Leichhardt and Annandale to the south with the passing of the Local Government (Areas) Act 1948.

Council history and location
The Municipality of Balmain was proclaimed on 21 February and Gazetted on 27 February, with the first elections held on 27 March 1860. The election of the first nine councillors was declared on 5 April 1860, with the first meeting occurring on the first day and the election of the first chairman, Rev. Ralph Mansfield. Following the passing of the Municipalities Act, 1867, Chairman was retitled "Mayor" and Councillors became Aldermen. With this Act, the council also became known as the Borough of Balmain (From 28 December 1906, with the passing of the Local Government Act, 1906, the council was again renamed as the "Municipality of Balmain"). On 3 September 1913, the six acres of land adjoining Callan Park Asylum grounds, known as Callan Park were transferred from Leichhardt Council to Balmain, bringing the boundaries further south.

The council first met on 5 April 1860 in the loft of a warehouse owned by Councillor Thomas Rowntree on Mort Bay (now the site of Gilchrist Place), then to rooms rented on the western side of Adolphus Street and thereafter in St Mary's schoolroom at 7 Adolphus Street. From 1862 to 1876, the council met in the Balmain School of Arts on 142 Darling Street. The current site of the Balmain Town Hall on Darling Street was purchased in 1876 and the existing stone cottage on the site became the council chambers. The council approved the building of new Council meeting chambers, located as a rear extension to the existing cottage, on 16 March 1880, designed by former Balmain mayor James McDonald, which were completed and opened in June 1881. However the need for large premises and a community hall for public meetings was needed and in 1888 a design by the sitting mayor Edward Harman Buchanan was accepted and demolition of the existing cottage commenced. Buchanan's design in the Victorian Free Classical style town hall included the centenary hall, a library, mayor's room, several rooms for council officers, and a council clerk's residence. The council grew a reputation for its strong Labor councils from the 1920s and in 1942–1944 the council was composed entirely of Labor councillors, which led the council to abolish its committees in favour of a cabinet-style system.

By the end of the Second World War, the NSW Government had come to the conclusion, following the recommendation of the 1945–46 Clancy Royal Commission on Local Government Boundaries, that its ideas of infrastructure expansion could not be realised by the present system of the mostly-poor inner-city municipal councils and the Minister for Local Government, Joseph Cahill, pushed through a bill in 1948 that abolished a significant number of those councils. Balmain was abolished and amalgamated with Annandale into the Municipality of Leichhardt following the enactment of the Local Government (Areas) Act 1948, which came into effect from 1 January 1949.

Mayors

See also
 John McMahon, Balmain Alderman (1942–1944), State MP for Balmain (1950–1968).
 William O'Connor, Balmain Alderman (1944–1948), Member of the House of Representatives (1946–1969).

References

1860 establishments in Australia
1948 disestablishments in Australia
Balmain
Balmain
 
Inner West
Balmain, New South Wales